Faizal Rehman (born 1 December 1985) is an Indian football player playing for Mohammedan in I-League.

References

1985 births
Living people
Indian footballers
Mohammedan SC (Kolkata) players
Association football defenders